Ali Sayyad Shirazi, deputy chief of staff of the armed forces in Iran, was assassinated on 10 April 1999, 6:45 a.m. local time while leaving home for work. He was killed by an agent of Mojahedin-e Khalq, an Iranian opposition group, who was disguised as a street cleaner and handed Sayyad Shirazi a letter just before shooting him.

Background
There had been several attacks on senior officials in Iran in the months before Sayyad Shirazi's assassination, among them a senior judge, Ali Razini, the head of Iran's largest charity organisation, and Mohsen Rafighdoost, who were injured during separate assassination attempts. According to a spokesman for Mojahedin-e Khalq, an Iranian opposition group which advocates the end of Iran's clerical regime, several of the group's units had carried out the killings in northern Tehran. Mojahedin-e Khalq claimed the responsibility for the assassination of Asadollah Lajevardi, a former Iranian chief prosecutor and head of Iran's Prisons Organization, who was assassinated on 23 August 1998.

Ali Sayyad Shirazi had personally commanded several of Iran's major offensives in the Iran–Iraq War, earning him the nickname "Iron Man".

Assassination

Ali Sayyad Shirazi was fatally shot by an unknown assailant while leaving home for work. He was taken to Farhang hospital where he was pronounced dead at 54. The assailant was disguised as a municipality street sweeper. According to witnesses, Sayyad Shirazi received three bullets. His son, Mahdi, who was present at the assassination scene, described the incident:

Sayyad Shirazi was killed for his roles in Mersad Operation. According to Rahim Safavi, commenting 11 years after Sayyad Shirazi's death, the assassination operation was carried out at Saddam Hussein's order.

A Mujahedeen Khalq spokesman said that Shirazi had been targeted because for "purging and executing military personnel and for the deaths of hundreds of thousands of teen-agers in the Iran-Iraq war of the 1980's, in which he commanded Iran's ground forces."

Perpetrator
Shahin Gobadi, the spokesman for MEK in Paris, told the Associated Press in Cairo via a telephone call that "the group's units inside Iran were responsible for the killing." Zahra Ghaemi was described by the Iranian media as being in the charge of the assassination team.

Aftermath
Sayyad Shirazi's funeral was held the day after the attack. Iranian supreme leader, Ayatollah Ali Khamenei, participated. According to Sayyad Shirazi's son, Mahdi, the assassination file was being prosecuted by a court in France, and he was summoned in 2009 by the court to detail the incident.

References

1999 deaths
Assassinated Iranian people
Assassination campaigns
1999 in Iran
Conflicts involving the People's Mojahedin Organization of Iran